Trichypena is a genus of moths of the family Noctuidae. The genus was erected by Joseph de Joannis in 1915.

Some species of this genus are:
Trichypena malagasy (Viette, 1968)
Trichypena quadra de Joannis, 1915

Trichypena may also be considered a synonym of Hypena Schrank, 1802.

References

Hypeninae